Sowda is a cutaneous condition, a localized type of onchocerciasis.
This is mostly seen in patients with the disease from Yemen, Saudi Arabia, East and West Africa

See also 
 Skin lesion

References 

Parasitic infestations, stings, and bites of the skin